Keizoh Kawano (河野啓三, Kawano Keizoh; born February 4, 1971, in Tokyo, Japan) is a Japanese pianist, keyboardist, and composer who served as keyboardist and pianist for the band T-Square until August 2020.

Biography

Early life 
Kawano was born in Tokyo. He started playing the electone when he was 6 years old . While attending Kitazono High School in Tokyo, he started playing piano and synthesizer under the influence of his older brother. After graduating, he started working as a professional musician and as a support musician for singers and artists regardless of their music genre.

2000–2019: T-Square 
In 2000, bassist Toyoyuki Tanaka introduced Kawano to T-Square, a jazz fusion band he was a part of from 1981 to 1986. He joined the band as a support member from in the fall.  In 2004, he and drummer Satoshi Bandoh officially joined T-Square. In 2005, he joined the Kumi Adachi Club Pangea, which was formed by former T-Square drummer Hiroyuki Noritake.

In 2011, he announced the he would be releasing his first solo album, Dreams, going on tour to commemorate the release. The album released on November 23, 2011, and charted at No. 211 on the Oricon charts.

2019–present: Hospitalization and withdrawal from T-Square 
On February 6, 2019, Kawano was urgently hospitalized due to cerebral hemorrhage. Because of this, he took a break from musical activities and was replaced by Philippe Saisse. On August 27, 2019, through their official website, he reported that he was going to be discharged after being hospitalized for more than half a year. The update also mentioned the pathology and course of onset with moderate bleeding in his right putamen, but with treatment performed without the need of surgery. There was no hematoma, but he was paralyzed on his left side of the body and is now unable to play the piano as he had before. He continued with outpatient treatment and rehabilitation, but still played with the band in live performances and song production for the band's next album.

On August 27, 2020, it announced that it would withdraw from T-Square as he was concerned about the prognosis and rehabilitation after treatment for the cerebral hemorrhage that developed in 2019. It was judged that sufficient performance activity for the band would be difficult in his current state of recovery. When asked about his withdrawal, he had decided that he would do so before the spring of 2019, but his decision was opposed by Andoh who wanted him to stay. He participated in the production of AI Factory, released in 2020. On October 28, 2020, the album Crème de la Crème was released, making it his last album with T-Square as an official member. He appeared as a special guest at the T-Square Year-End Special 2020 in Tokyo, held at the Nihonbashi Mitsui Hall on December 31, 2020, and continues to perform with T-Square in live concerts and write songs for them to record in Studio Albums. He released his second solo album, "Best Friends" on November 23rd, 2022.

Discography

References 

1971 births
Japanese keyboardists
Japanese male pianists
Living people